Bettie Mae Fikes (born 1948), also known as The Voice of Selma, is an American singer and civil rights activist.

Life 
Born in Selma, Alabama in 1948, she began singing at the age of four. Fikes was a member of the Student Nonviolent Coordinating Committee (SNCC) Freedom Singers, and became known as "the Voice of Selma". She was jailed as a teenager in 1963 for her participation in a Selma protest and was also involved in Bloody Sunday in 1965. Her new lyrics for "This Little Light of Mine" and other songs became particularly known. She performed at both the 1964 Democratic National Convention and the 2004 Democratic National Convention. In 2020, she sang at the funeral services for John Lewis, which she indicated might be her final public performance.

References

Citations

Bibliography

External links
 
 

1948 births
Living people
Activists from Selma, Alabama
Singers from Alabama
American civil rights activists
20th-century American women singers
Musicians from Selma, Alabama
American blues singers
Student Nonviolent Coordinating Committee
21st-century American women singers
20th-century African-American women singers
African-American activists
20th-century American singers
21st-century American singers
Women civil rights activists
21st-century African-American women singers